Cecilia Chazama is a politician in Malawi, who has served as the Minister of Home Affairs and Internal Security, in the Cabinet of Malawi, since 24 October 2017. Before her current appointment, she was the Minister for Civic Education in the Malawian Cabinet.

Other considerations
Effective July 2018, Ms Chazama serves as the National Director for Women, in the ruling Democratic Progressive Party (DPP). She was elected at the third national elective convention of the party.

See also
 Parliament of Malawi
 Prime Minister of Malawi
 Grace Chiumia

References

External links
Minister Shocked With Dilapidated State of Phalombe VSU Structure
Peter Mutharika Departs for United Nations General Assembly

Living people
Year of birth missing (living people)
21st-century Malawian politicians
Government ministers of Malawi
Democratic Progressive Party (Malawi) politicians
Members of the National Assembly (Malawi)
Female interior ministers
Women government ministers of Malawi
21st-century Malawian women politicians